John Jiler is an American playwright, novelist, and journalist living in New York City.

Early life
Jiler was born in New York. His father, Milton W. Jiler, was a financial analyst and his mother, Dorothy Hayes, was a former editor at Vogue Magazine. Jiler started his education at the Riverdale Country School. He then attended the University of Pennsylvania  and the University of Hartford.

Career
After completing his education, Jiler began working as an actor. He performed at the Hartford Stage Company, the Public Theater, and other venues. He won the Chicago Drama Critics Award.

After acting, Jiler started writing. His first play, African Star was done at the Eugene O’Neill Playwrights Conference. He has been awarded a Jerome Fellowship, a Weissberger Prize from New Dramatists, and the Harold Arlen Award. For his musical Avenue X he won the Richard Rodgers and Edward Kleban Awards. Avenue X began at New York's Playwrights Horizons and has played some fifty cities around the world. His plays have also been performed at Labyrinth Theater and The Kennedy Center.

Jiler's first book, Dark Wind was published by St. Martin's Press and was called “a classic” by the Village Voice. His most recent, Sleeping With The Mayor was aNew York Times Notable Book Of The Year.

As a journalist, he has written for publications such as The New York Times, The Village Voice, and The Nation.

Family

Jiler is married to historian Elizabeth Hovey. They have two children, Jake and Stella.

References

Living people
1946 births
American dramatists and playwrights
American male novelists
American male journalists
University of Pennsylvania alumni
University of Hartford alumni
Writers from New York City